Jérémy Stravius (born 14 July 1988) is a French swimmer, swimming freestyle, backstroke, and butterfly.

Career
Stravius appeared on the world stage at the 2009 European Short Course Swimming Championships in Istanbul where he was part of the winning 4 × 50 m freestyle relay and finished in the top 8 in the 50 m breaststroke. The next year at the 2010 European Short Course Swimming Championships in Hungary, Stravius won his first medal at an international meet, winning a silver in the 100 m backstroke. At this meet, he also was part of the winning 4 × 100 m medley relay and the bronze medal winning team of the 4 × 200 m freestyle relay. Stravius won his first international gold winning the gold medal in the 100 m backstroke at the 2011 FINA World Championships in Shanghai. He shared it with countryman Camille Lacourt. He also received a silver in the 4 × 100 m freestyle relay and the 4 × 200 m freestyle relay at this meet.

Stravius got third at the French Olympic Trials in the 100 m backstroke, just missing out on a chance to swim an individual event at the Olympics. At the 2012 Summer Olympics he won two medals, competing on the gold medal-winning 4 × 100 m freestyle relay and silver medal-winning 4 × 200 m freestyle relay teams for France, but only swimming the heats.

On 28 July 2013, at the FINA World Championships in Barcelona, Stravius was part of the winning 4 × 100 m medley relay where he swam the butterfly leg. Stravius was in the anchor position for France in the 4 × 100 m men's freestyle final. The French were the defending Olympic champions but were seeded outside the middle lanes in the final, causing Stravius to remark "On n'était pas favoris, c'est un hold up".  In the final, after 200 m where France was far off from the leading three teams, Fabien Gilot exploded through with a 46.90s third leg to bring the French back into contention. Then, Stravius took over the Australians at the start of his leg and trailing the Russians and American swimmers at the midpoint of his anchor leg, Stravius snapped a precise flipturn and, after several powerful dolphin kicks underwater, emerged ahead by a hand, eventually securing the gold medal for France by 0.26s. He also won silver medals in the 50 m backstroke and the 100 m backstroke. At this meet he also swam the 200 m individual medley and the 4 × 200 m freestyle relay.

At the 2014 European Aquatics Championships in Berlin, Stravius earned two silver medals, one of them in the 50 m backstroke and the other in the 100 m backstroke. He also won a gold in the 4 × 100 m freestyle relay.

Stravius currently holds the French National Record in the 200 m individual medley and the 100 m butterfly (short course).

Personal life
He is openly gay and was the among the 6 French LGBT athletes featured in the documentary We Need to Talk.

References

External links

Living people
1988 births
Sportspeople from Abbeville
French male backstroke swimmers
French male freestyle swimmers
French male medley swimmers
Olympic gold medalists for France
Olympic silver medalists for France
World Aquatics Championships medalists in swimming
Olympic swimmers of France
Swimmers at the 2012 Summer Olympics
Swimmers at the 2016 Summer Olympics
Medalists at the FINA World Swimming Championships (25 m)
European Aquatics Championships medalists in swimming
Medalists at the 2012 Summer Olympics
French male butterfly swimmers
European champions for France
Medalists at the 2016 Summer Olympics
Olympic gold medalists in swimming
Olympic silver medalists in swimming
Mediterranean Games silver medalists for France
Swimmers at the 2009 Mediterranean Games
Mediterranean Games medalists in swimming
French LGBT sportspeople
LGBT swimmers
20th-century French people
21st-century French people